Mohammed Ali Madani was the leader of the Zintan Brigade of the anti-Gaddafi forces during the 2011 Libyan civil war, until his death during the Nafusa Mountains Campaign from bullets fired by pro-Gaddafi forces.

Madani was a member of the former elite Saiqa Libyan army division and had fought in Chad. He was known as a man of great charisma and military experience. After his death his son, Salah, led the brigade into Tripoli.

References

2011 deaths
Libyan military personnel killed in action
People killed in the First Libyan Civil War
Year of birth missing